Nicole Frances Parker (born February 21, 1978) is an American actress. She is best known for her work on Fox's sketch comedy show Mad TV (2003–2009, 2016), which she was a regular cast member. In July 2009, Parker concluded her run as Elphaba in the Broadway production of Wicked, a role that she reprised on tour across North America. She voiced Penelope Pitstop in the animated series Wacky Races (2017–2019) and has appeared in the parody films Meet the Spartans and Disaster Movie (both 2008). Parker currently co-hosts the Earwolf podcast The Neighborhood Listen, along with comedian Paul F. Tompkins.

Early life
In her hometown of Irvine, California, she performed at South Coast Repertory and Laguna Playhouse. She also studied Theatre and Voice at Indiana University and performed in an improv troupe called  Full Frontal Comedy. After college, Parker performed at the Edinburgh Fringe Festival, the Second City in Chicago, Bloemendaal, Unhinged Academy and Groningen. In addition, she and some college friends formed a theater company in New York City called Waterwell Productions. Parker moved to Amsterdam for two years, where she performed in the comedy show Boom Chicago alongside MADtv alumni Ike Barinholtz and Jordan Peele.

Career

Mad TV
In 2003, Parker joined the Season 9 cast of Mad TV. She was a featured performer, until Season 10, when she was promoted to cast member. Parker left the show on March 28, 2009, but appeared in sketches until the series finale in 2009.

Parker's most notable characters include Pat-Beth LaMontrose and the Disney Girl. She also had impersonated many notable celebrities, mostly singers such as Britney Spears, Ashlee and Jessica Simpson, Julie Andrews, James Blunt, and Judy Garland.

Characters
 Amy Little
 Annetta Bussley
 Beth
 Candy Matsumoto
 Charlene
 Disney Girl
 Elisssa
 Holly
 Joan Pedestrian
 Pat-Beth LaMontrose
 Sharon
 Toni Horse
 Tori McLachlan

Celebrity impressions

Alanis Morissette
Alexis Bledel
Amy Winehouse
Ashlee Simpson
Ashley Judd
Ashley Tisdale
Britney Spears
Cat Deely
Celine Dion
Christiane Amanpour
Dina Lohan
Elizabeth Smart
Ellen DeGeneres
Emily Strayer (of the Dixie Chicks)
Emma Thompson
Feist
Fergie
Gwen Stefani
Hillary Clinton
James Blunt
Jeanne Bice
Jessica Simpson
Joy Behar
Judith Regan
Judy Garland (as Dorothy Gale in The Wizard of Oz)
Julie Andrews
Kathy Griffin
Katie Couric
Katie Holmes
Kelly Clarkson
Kim Kardashian
Kristin Cavallari
Lauren Conrad
Lisa Gerrard
Liza Minnelli
Lucille Ball (as Lucy Ricardo in I Love Lucy)
Mary Kay Letourneau
Melania Trump
Nancy Grace
Nelly Furtado
Norah Jones
Paula Abdul
Paula Zahn
Rachael Ray
Renée Zellweger  
Samantha Harris
Sarah Palin
Sarah Jessica Parker
Sarah Silverman 
Sharon Osbourne  
Teresa Heinz Kerry
Teri Hatcher (as Susan Mayer in Desperate Housewives)
Tonya Harding
Vivien Leigh (as Scarlett O'Hara in Gone with the Wind)

Theatre
In 2004, Parker was nominated for a Jeff Award for her performance in The People vs. Friar Laurence, The Man Who Killed Romeo and Juliet.

From July 2006 to January 2007, Parker performed in the comedy musical Martin Short: Fame Becomes Me.

In 2009, Parker replaced Marcie Dodd in the role of Elphaba in the Broadway production of the musical Wicked, from January 16. She starred opposite Alli Mauzey as Glinda. She exited on July 19 at the end of her six-month contract, and was replaced by Dee Roscioli.

Parker starred in the new musical The People in the Picture, which began performances at Studio 54 on April 1, 2011 and officially opened on April 28, 2011.

Parker again starred as Elphaba in Wicked on the show's first North American tour. She reunited with Mauzey beginning performances in Denver, Colorado May 18, 2012. She replaced Mamie Parris. She later left the production on September 24, 2012.

The Groundlings
Parker frequently guest performs in the improvisational comedy show Cookin' With Gas at The Groundlings Theatre in Hollywood, California.

Filmography

Film roles

Television roles

Theatre

Awards and nominations

References

External links

Official MADtv website

1978 births
21st-century American actresses
Actresses from California
American impressionists (entertainers)
American musical theatre actresses
American stage actresses
American television actresses
American voice actresses
American women comedians
Living people
People from Irvine, California
American sketch comedians
Comedians from California
21st-century American comedians